Jutrosin  (Gutterschin, older Morginberg) is a town in Rawicz County, Greater Poland Voivodeship, Poland, with 1,947 inhabitants (2014). The rivers Orla and Radęca converge near the town. Jutrosin received town privileges in 1534.

Gallery

Notable residents
 Edmund Elend (1881–1933), merchant and department store owner
 Michael Friedländer (1833–1910), Orientalist 
 Krystyna Łybacka (born 1946), politician
 Alfred Trzebinski (1902–1946), SS-physician at the Auschwitz, Majdanek and Neuengamme concentration camps executed for war crimes

References

External links
 
 Historia Żydów w Jutrosinie na portalu Wirtualny Sztetl

Cities and towns in Greater Poland Voivodeship
Rawicz County